Holsworthy Community College is a co-educational secondary school located in Holsworthy in the English county of Devon.

Previously a community school administered by Devon County Council, Holsworthy Community College became a foundation school on 31 August 2012 as part of a federation with Okehampton College. In January 2018 the school converted to academy status and is now sponsored by the Dartmoor Multi Academy Trust.

Holsworthy Community College offers GCSEs, BTECs and Cambridge Nationals as programmes of study for pupils. The school was awarded specialist Technology College status on 1 September 2006 which funded a science and technology extension to the building.

References

External links
Holsworthy Community College official website

Secondary schools in Devon
Academies in Devon
Holsworthy